John Harte  may refer to:

John Harte (mayor) (died 1604), Lord Mayor of London for 1589
John Harte (scientist) (born 1939), American ecologist

See also
Jack Harte (disambiguation)
John Hart (disambiguation)